Michael Chan Wai-man (born 10 July 1943) is a Hong Kong actor and martial artist. A Hakka of Wuhua ancestry born in New Territories, Chan was well known for various triad roles, when in actuality he had been involved with triads in real life. In a media interview, he admitted to have been the No. 2 in the 14K Triad that dominated vice in Tsim Sha Tsui before the handover of Hong Kong. Having worked as a police officer in the prison system, he came into contact with many underworld figures and joined the Triads. Chan was expelled from the Royal Hong Kong Police as a result of his links.

Personal life 
In his twenties, Chan met his partner Ng Kwok-ying, and together they have had three children. The couple married in 2020 after being together for 50 years.

Filmography

Films

The Way of the Bug (2018)
Chasing the Dragon (2017)
Muay Thai Girls (2016)
Super Bodyguard (2016)
Gangster Payday (2014)
Triad (2012)
Lives in Flames (2012)
Gallants (2010)
Run Papa Run (2008)
A Chinese Tall Story (2005)
Where's Mamma's Boy? (2005)
6 A.M. (2005)
Enter The Phoenix (2004)
Yellow Dragon (2003)
Lost in Time (2003)
The Spy Dad (2003)
Bullets of Love (2001)
Old Master Q 2001 (2001)
You Shoot, I Shoot (2001)
Mafia Dot Com (2000)
Metade Fumaca (2000)
The Kingdom of Mob (1999)
Heaven of Hope (1999)
Deadly Illusion (1998)
A True Mob Story (1998)
Young And Dangerous: The Prequel (1998)
We're No Bad Guys (1997)
Beyond The Copline (1996)
Mongkok Story (1996)
Once Upon A Time in Triad Society (1996)
To Be No.1 (1996)
Young and Dangerous 3 (1996)
Mr. X (1995)
Teddy Boy (1995)
Hong Kong Adam's Family (1994)
Lady Super Cops (1993)
The Mad Monk (1993)
No More Love, No More Death (1993)
The Wild Girls (1993)
All Mighty Gambler (1993)
Truant Heroes (1992)
Once A Black Sheep (1992)
Heroes of Earth (1992)
Gun n' Rose (1992)
What a Hero! (1992)
Talk To Me Dicky (1992)
Lee Rock II (1991)
Lee Rock (1991)
Gangland Odyssey (1990)
Bloody Brotherhood (1989)
Project A Part II (1987)
In The Line of Duty (1986)
Pom Pom Strikes Back (1986)
Legacy of Rage (1986)
Ninja Strike (1985)
The Master Strikes Back (1985)
Profile in Anger (1984)
Three Stooges Go Undercover (1984)
Five Element Ninjas (1982)
Winner Takes All (1982)
Crimson Street (1982)
Mercenaries From Hong Kong (1982)
Dragon Lord (1982)
The Legal Illegals (1981)
The Mad Cold-Blooded Murder (1981)
The Club (1981)
The Heroes (1980)
Handcuffs (1979)
The Deadly Breaking Sword (1979)
The Proud Youth (1978)
Godfather's Fury (1978)
The Mad, The Mean and the Deadly (1978)
Bruce Lee, The Invincible (1978)
The Invincible Killer (1978)
Judgment of an Assassin (1977)
Broken Oath (1977)
Deadly Chase For Justice (1977)
Ferocious Monk From Shaolin (1977)
The Big Boss Part 2 (1976)
Bruce's Deadly Fingers (1976)
Jumping Ash (1976)
All Men Are Brothers (1975)
The Female Fugitive (1975)
Chinese Mack (1974)
The Bravest Fist (1974)
Chinese Hercules (1973)
Spirits of Bruce Lee (1973)
Adventure in Denmark (1973)
Tiger Vs Dragon (1972)
Love And Blood (1972)
Black List (1972)

TV series
The Legend of the Condor Heroes (1976)
The Return of the Condor Heroes (1976)
OCTB (2017)

References 

 
 http://hkmdb.com/db/people/view.mhtml?id=3965&display_set=eng
 http://www.hkcinemagic.com/en/people.asp?id=365

External links

HK cinemagic entry

Hong Kong male film actors
1946 births
Living people
Indigenous inhabitants of the New Territories in Hong Kong
Hong Kong people of Hakka descent
People from Wuhua
Hong Kong male kickboxers
Hong Kong Muay Thai practitioners